Aniel is an angel in Jewish lore and angelology.

Aniel may also refer to:
 (1797-1865), French ballet master
, the 26th issue of comic book series  Thorgal
Aniel, Israel, a moshav in Israel
Aniel, a robot  in the short story "The Accident" from Tales of Pirx the Pilot by Stanisław Lem (1973)
Aniel, father of Talorc I, king of Picts